Parapharyngodon colonensis is a species of gastrointestinal nematodes that completes its life cycle in lizards, first found in Panama.

References

Further reading

de Oca, Edgar Uriel Garduño-Montes, Rosario Mata-López, and Virginia León-Règagnon. "Two new species of Parapharyngodon parasites of Sceloporus pyrocephalus, with a key to the species found in Mexico (Nematoda, Pharyngodonidae)." ZooKeys 559 (2016): 1.
Jiménez, Francisco Agustín, Virginia León-Règagnon, and Edmundo Pérez-Ramos. "Dos especies nuevas de Parapharyngodon (Oxyuroidea: Pharyngodonidae) de los enigmáticos Bipes canaliculatus and Bipes tridactylus (Squamata: Bipedidae)." Revista mexicana de biodiversidad 79 (2008): 113-120.

Secernentea
Parasites of lizards